Petrina Fung Bo Bo (born 30 October 1954) is a Malaysian-born Chinese actress in Hong Kong. Fung is known for the 1994 film C'est la vie, mon chéri.

Early life 
On October 30, 1954, Fung was born in Malaysia. Fung's father is Fung Fung, an actor. Fung's brother is Fung Hak-On, also an actor. At age 12, Fung lived with Madam Wee Poh Keok, whom she called "kai leong", or godmother. Fung also learned to speak the Hokkien dialect from her godmother. Fung's education consists of private tutors. At age 16, Fung flew to England to study.

Career
Fung started her career as a child actress. In 1956, at age 2 and a half, Fung debuted in Love vs Love (aka Little Sweetheart), written and directed by her father. By age 14, Fung had made more than 300 films, and was a noted stage performer across most of South East Asia. Fung was known as the Shirley Temple of Hong Kong and Chinese Canto Region.

She then went to study in the United Kingdom, during which she met her future first husband, Chiu Joi Keung, who worked in finance.

In 1976, Fung worked with Eddie Lau, a fashion designer in Hong Kong.

In Hong Kong, director Clifton Ko offered Fung the leading role in Wonder Mama, a television drama film.

During the 1980s she starred in a series of historical television period dramas, including playing China's lone female emperor, Wu Zetian. She made her film comeback in 1986 in the comedy My Family, also written by and associated produced by Clifton Ko.

In 1994, Fung retired from acting. Fung occasionally made special appearances in some films.

Filmography

Films

Awards 
 Star on Avenue of the Stars. Hong, Kong.

Personal life
Fung's first husband was Chiu Joi Keung. They have two sons. In 1997, Fung married Yoong Siew Chuen, a Malaysian architect, and moved to Penang Island, Malaysia. In 2012, Fung divorced Yoong Siew Chuen and moved to Hong Kong.

References

External links
 
 
 Petrina Fung Bo Bo at hkcinemagic.com
 Fung Bo-Bo at lovehkfilm.com
 Fung Bo-bo at allmovie.com

 

Hong Kong film actresses
Hong Kong child actresses
1954 births
Living people
Hong Kong people of Malaysian descent
Malaysian people of Cantonese descent
People from Sandakan
20th-century Hong Kong actresses
21st-century Hong Kong actresses
Hong Kong television actresses
Adoptees
Malaysian born Hong Kong artists